Cafcaf Humour Magazine (as known as Cafcaf) is a magazine that has been published in Turkey since 2007. It is published once every three months. The director of the magazine is Asım Gültekin.

In 2007, Cafcaf started to be published as part of Genç Dergi’s addition. In December 2008, Cafcaf became independent and started to be sold as single publication. At various times, Cafcafs frequency changed as monthly or twice a month. Now, however, it is published once every three months.

Some think Cafcaf is of interest only to Muslims, but Gültekin, said that Cafcaf should appeal to anyone who likes caricature.

Some of writers and drawers
 Adem Mermerkaya
 Ahmet Altay
 Ahmet Mutlu
 Ahmet Keskin
 Betül Zarifoğlu
 Behlül Balkan
 Bülent Akyürek
 Büşra Tosun Durmuş
 Cihangir Bayburtoğlu
 Derya Işık Özbay
 Ebru Zeynep Yetimakman
 Emre Bilgiç
 Gülsüm Kavuncu
 Faruk Günindi
 Feridun Demir
 Hakan Öztürk
 Mustafa Yavuz
 Murat Menteş
 Niyazi Çol
 Ömer Faruk Dönmez
 Ramazan Yıldız
 Salih Kılınç
 Serhat Albamya
 Şafak Tavkul
 Turgut Yılmaz
 Volkan Akmeşe
 Yasir Buğra Eryılmaz
 Yavuz Girgin
 Yusuf Kot

References

External links

2007 establishments in Turkey
Humor magazines
Magazines established in 2007
Magazines published in Istanbul
Satirical magazines published in Turkey
Turkish-language magazines
Triannual magazines
Islamic magazines